Phyllonorycter abrasella is a moth of the family Gracillariidae. It is found from the Czech Republic and Slovakia to France, Italy and Greece. There is a disjunct population in southern Russia.

The larvae feed on Quercus cerris. They mine the leaves of their host plant. The mine consists of a rather small, lower-surface tentiform mine, generally in the centre of the leaf. There are fine folds in the lower epidermis, and the upperside is mottled green. The frass is deposited in a clump. The pupa is made in an oval, parchment-like cocoon that is free of frass and lies loose in the mine.

External links
 bladmineerders.nl 
 Fauna Europaea

aberrans
Moths described in 1843
Moths of Europe
Taxa named by Philogène Auguste Joseph Duponchel

Leaf miners